La Mancha is a natural and historical region in the Spanish provinces of Albacete, Cuenca, Ciudad Real, and Toledo. It is an arid but fertile plateau (610 m or 2000 ft) that stretches from the mountains of Toledo to the western spurs of the Cuenca hills, bordered to the south by the Sierra Morena and to the north by Alcarria. The La Mancha historical comarca constitutes the southern portion of Castilla-La Mancha autonomous community and makes up most of the present-day administrative region.

Name
The name "La Mancha" is probably derived from the Arabic word المنشأ al-mansha, meaning  "birthplace" or "fountainhead". The name of the city of Almansa in Albacete shares that origin. The word mancha in Spanish literally means spot, stain, or patch, but no apparent link exists between this word and the name of the region.

Geography

The largest plain in Spain, La Mancha is made up of a plateau averaging 500 to 600 metres in altitude (although it reaches 900 metres in Campo de Montiel and other parts), centering on the province of Ciudad Real. The region is watered by the Guadiana, Jabalón, Záncara, Cigüela, and Júcar rivers.

Climate
The climate is cold semi-arid (Köppen BSk), with strong fluctuations. Farming (wheat, barley, oats, sugar beets, wine grapes, olives) and cattle raising are the primary economic activities, but they are severely restricted by the harsh environmental conditions.

Culture

The inhabitants of La Mancha are called Manchegos.

Agriculture
La Mancha has always been an important agricultural zone. Viticulture is important in Tomelloso, Alcázar de San Juan, Socuéllamos,  Valdepeñas, La Solana  and Manzanares, in Ciudad Real and Villarrobledo in Albacete.  Other crops include cereals (hence the famous windmills) and saffron.  Sheep are raised and bred, providing the famous Manchego cheese, as are goats, including the La Mancha goat, one of the assumed progenitors of the American La Mancha goat.

La Mancha includes one National Park, Las Tablas de Daimiel, and one Natural Park, Las Lagunas de Ruidera.

People
Famous Spaniards like the cinema directors Pedro Almodóvar and José Luis Cuerda, painters Antonio López and his uncle Antonio López Torres, footballer Andrés Iniesta, music band Angelus Apatrida and actress Sara Montiel were born in La Mancha.

La Mancha and Cervantes

Miguel de Cervantes described La Mancha and its windmills in his two-part 1605/1615 novel Don Quixote de La Mancha. Cervantes was making fun of the region, using a pun; a "mancha" was also a stain, as on one's honor, and thus an inappropriately named homeland for a dignified knight-errant. Translator John Ormsby believed that Cervantes chose it because it was the most ordinary, prosaic, anti-romantic, and therefore unlikely place from which a chivalrous, romantic hero could originate, making Quixote seem even more absurd. However, ironically, due to the fame of Cervantes' character, the name of La Mancha came to be associated worldwide with romantic chivalry.

Several film versions of Don Quixote have been filmed largely in La Mancha. However, some, including the 1957 Russian film version, and the screen version of Man of La Mancha, were not. The 1957 film was shot in Crimea, while Man of La Mancha was filmed in Italy. G. W. Pabst's 1933 version of Cervantes's novel was shot in Alpes-de-Haute-Provence. The 2000 made-for-TV Don Quixote, starring John Lithgow as Don Quixote and Bob Hoskins as Sancho Panza, was shot on several locations in Spain, but not in La Mancha.

See also
 Manchuela ("lesser La Mancha"), a comarca in La Mancha. 
 La Mancha (DO), a Spanish Denominación de Origen (DO) for wines.
 Manche, a coastal department in Normandy, France.
 The English Channel, known in Spanish as Canal de la Mancha.

References

External links

Folk music from La Mancha

Castilla–La Mancha
Comarcas of Castilla–La Mancha
Geography of Castilla–La Mancha
Historical regions in Spain
Natural regions of Spain